Donnet is a French surname. Notable people with the surname include:

Ferdinand-François-Auguste Donnet (1795–1882), French cardinal
James Donnet (1816–1905), British Royal Navy surgeon
Jean-Baptiste Donnet (1923–2014), French chemist
Jenny Donnet (born 1963), Australian diver
Martial Donnet (born 1956), Swiss alpine skier
Matías Donnet (born 1980), Argentine footballer
Michel Donnet (1917–2013), Belgian Air Force and Royal Air Force officer

French-language surnames